Jason Christopher Dellaero (born December 17, 1976) is a former shortstop in Major League Baseball. He played for the Chicago White Sox in 1999.

Dellaero was drafted by the New York Yankees in the 17th round of the 1994 Major League Baseball draft out of Brewster High School in Brewster, New York but did not sign because the Yankees wanted him to pitch. He instead played college baseball at St. John's where he hit .323 as a freshman before transferring to South Florida where he played two years. In 1996, he played collegiate summer baseball with the Orleans Cardinals of the Cape Cod Baseball League. In 1997, he hit .324 with 20 home runs at South Florida. The White Sox selected him 15th overall in the 1997 Major League Baseball draft.

Dellaero made his major league debut on September 7, 1999 against the Anaheim Angels. In eleven games that season, he managed only three hits in 35 plate appearances. Dellaero struggled in subsequent seasons in the minors despite several adjustments including batting exclusively from the right side of the plate and visiting a sports psychologist. In 2002, the White Sox tried using Dellaero as a pitcher; he put up an earned run average of 8.47 in 17 minor league innings. His last season of affiliated baseball came in 2003 and was followed by parts of three seasons in the independent Atlantic League and Golden Baseball League.

References

External links

1976 births
Living people
Baseball players at the 1995 Pan American Games
Baseball players from New York (state)
Birmingham Barons players
Camden Riversharks players
Charlotte Knights players
Chattanooga Lookouts players
Chicago White Sox players
Gulf Coast White Sox players
Hickory Crawdads players
Major League Baseball shortstops
Newark Bears players
Orleans Firebirds players
Pan American Games competitors for the United States
People from Mount Kisco, New York
St. George Roadrunners players
St. John's Red Storm baseball players
South Florida Bulls baseball players
Wichita Wranglers players
Winston-Salem Warthogs players